The city of Ottawa, Canada held municipal elections on December 7, 1931.

Mayor of Ottawa

Ottawa Board of Control
(4 elected)

Ottawa City Council

(2 elected from each ward)

References
Ottawa Citizen, December 8, 1931

Municipal elections in Ottawa
Ottawa
1930s in Ottawa
1931 in Ontario
December 1931 events